The discography of Soilwork, a Swedish melodic death metal band, consists of twelve studio albums, one live album, two compilation albums, two extended plays, twelve singles and ten music videos.

Albums

Studio albums

Live albums

Compilation albums

Extended plays

Singles

Music videos

Notes

A   "Departure Plan" and "Rejection Role" were released together as a double A-side single in Germany.
B   "Exile" and "The Pittsburgh Syndrome" were released together as a double A-side single in Germany.

References

External links
 Official website
 Soilwork at AllMusic
 

Heavy metal group discographies
Discographies of Swedish artists